Kings Kaleidoscope is an American alternative rock band based in Seattle, led by producer, singer and songwriter Chad Gardner. Their music features an eclectic range of electronic, woodwind, string and brass instruments, with a musical style described as indie rock meets hip hop production with a sprinkle of Disney. Kings Kaleidoscope has recorded four EPs and six LPs, as well as a series of live studio sessions.

Background 

Based out of Seattle, Washington, Kings Kaleidoscope formed in 2010 at a Mars Hill Church plant on the campus of the University of Washington, where Gardner was a worship leader. Drawing on a variety of influences from math rock and hip-hop, to the dense sound of Canadian indie outfit Broken Social Scene, they recorded their first live EP, Sin, at a Good Friday service in 2011. A year later, they released the studio EP, Asaph's Arrows, followed by a Christmas EP, Joy Has Dawned.

In late 2013, Gardner and the band announced they were leaving Mars Hill,  where they had served as worship leaders and artists on the church's label. Their fourth EP, 2014's Live in Color, was released by BadChristian Music. Working with BadChristian Music and well-established indie label Tooth & Nail Records, they released their debut LP, Becoming Who We Are, on October 27, 2014. Their second studio album Beyond Control was released June 24, 2016, and was the band's most commercially successful release to date.

On August 17, 2017, the band released a mixtape, The Beauty Between, that includes several collaborations with hip-hop artists and producers, including Propaganda, Andy Mineo, Beautiful Eulogy, Derek Minor, Beleaf and DSTL. Their third studio album, Zeal, was released on April 5, 2019.

Current members 

 Chad Gardner - vocals, guitar, keyboards, production, tambourine
 Daniel Steele - drums, synth, programming, vocals
 Zach Boyd - guitar, cello, sampling, mullet, vocals
 Beserat Tafesse - trombone, trumpet, euphonium, vocals
 John McNeill - bass, synth, vocals
 JJ Kim - guitar, bass, vocals
 Matthew Warren - visuals

Discography

Studio albums

Mixtapes

Extended plays

Live recordings

Notes

References 

Tooth & Nail Records artists
American Christian musical groups